Taughmonagh is a small housing estate in south west Belfast, Northern Ireland, within the civil parishes of Drumbeg and Shankill, and barony of Belfast Upper. When the area was first built, the houses consisted of very basic, small, prefabricated aluminium bungalows, with the estate nicknamed "Tin Town". The area was regenerated and there are now about 600 houses. These houses were historically owned by the Northern Ireland Housing Executive, but within recent years many of the residents have bought their houses from the executive, increasing the proportion of private ownership.

Taughmonagh is a staunch loyalist estate. It's based in South-West Belfast.

Local amenities 

Taughmonagh is situated between the Upper Malone Road and Lisburn Road. On the Upper Malone Road, the residents can make use of various shops and amenities at the Dubs Stores. Towards the Lisburn Road, the many amenities include a petrol station, Chinese take-aways and further shops and restaurants in the neighbouring Finaghy area. Within Taughmonagh, there is a small convenience store and a Presbyterian church which was completed in 2007.

The main community group is Taughmonagh Community Forum formed in 1996 which supports a Family Learning Centre, a Community Resource Centre and operates a day nursery called "Scribbles". The Community Forum also operates a number of inter-community and cross-community projects including links with neighbouring Benmore and Annadale through the Live and Learn Open Doors Project, and cross-border links with Manorhamilton in County Leitrim in the Republic of Ireland. 

The Taughmonagh Youth Club is used by people aged seven to twenty-five. Here, children and adults can interact with each other and with members of other youth clubs. The area also contains a small children's park, which has recently been renovated with a football/basketball area enclosed by a cage for the safety of surrounding roads and houses. The estate has its own social club which is used by the community and also serves meals. The club's premises can be booked for events such as birthdays, weddings etc. 

There is a new small local chippy called Nellie’s Nibbles it’s located in the club car park, it is open every Monday, Wednesday, Friday, Saturday (morning and night) and Sunday morning. The chippy first opened on December 2nd th 2020

There is a new small Community Gym finished construction in 2019 it has a weights room (down the stairs), cardio sweet (up the stairs), a nail bar upstairs, a hall (up the stairs), changing rooms (up the stairs) and beside it there is a extension to scribbles.

Education 
A small school, Taughmonagh Primary School, is currently under construction in the Findon Gardens area of Taughmonagh. Approximately over 100 pupils attend the school.Mostly Protestants. Classes are held in temporary classrooms on the site; the campus also features a nursery. 

Nearby on Upper Malone Road is the Fleming Fulton School for children with physical disabilities.

Transport 
The area is serviced by the 9B/9C Metro bus, which travels to and from Belfast city centre via Finnis Drive and Lisburn Road, and by the 8A/8B/8C, which stops at nearby Dub Lane on Upper Malone Road. The nearest train stations are at Finaghy, or at Balmoral opposite the King's Hall. Both of these stations lie on NI Railways Route 1, Newry–Portadown–Lisburn–Belfast–Bangor.

Fold Housing Trust 
The Fold Housing Trust, a non-profit organisation dedicated to helping elderly and disabled people within the community, manages some properties in Taughmonagh. The trust offers practical assistance and support to repair, adapt or improve homes across Northern Ireland.

Paramilitary activity 
A predominantly loyalist area, Taughmonagh has for a number of years been a stronghold of the Ulster Defence Association (UDA) with two of the organisation's South Belfast Brigadiers, Alex Kerr and incumbent Jackie McDonald, based on the estate. In 1991 the group was responsible for shooting dead Catholic taxi driver Harry Conlon, who was abducted after going to a bogus taxi call at the Devenish bar on Finaghy Road North and forced to drive into Taughmonagh. In 2002 and 2003, during a feud between the UDA's West Belfast Brigade, led by Johnny Adair, and the rest of the UDA, 
the Taughmonagh UDA deployed an air-raid siren which would be set off if "foreign" cars entered the estate. Activities by the UDA on the estate included an alleged drug dealer being the victim of a tarring and feathering attack in 2007.

References 

Geography of Belfast
Civil parish of Drumbeg
Civil parish of Shankill
Barony of Belfast Upper
Belfast City Council